Restio subverticillatus, the whorled restio, is a species of flowering plant in the family Restionaceae, native to temperate South Africa.

Modified branches at each node produce whorls of foliage. It is dioecious, meaning that female and male plants are separate. Flowering in Spring, female flowers are white, while male flowers are yellow/grey.

This plant has won the Royal Horticultural Society's Award of Garden Merit. It is grown primarily for its elegant arching foliage. As it does not bear temperatures below freezing, it requires protection during the winter months in colder areas.

References 

Restionaceae
Flora of South Africa